Proctolabus is a genus of short-horned grasshoppers in the family Acrididae. There are about eight described species in Proctolabus, found in Mexico and the southwestern United States.

Species
These species belong to the genus Proctolabus:
 Proctolabus brachypterus Bruner, 1908
 Proctolabus cerciatus Hebard, 1925
 Proctolabus chiapensis Descamps, 1976
 Proctolabus diferens Márquez Mayaudón, 1963
 Proctolabus edentatus Descamps, 1976
 Proctolabus gracilis Bruner, 1908
 Proctolabus mexicanus (Saussure, 1859)
 Proctolabus oaxacae Descamps, 1976

References

External links

 

Acrididae